Exilioidea atlantica is a species of sea snail, a marine gastropod mollusk in the family Ptychatractidae.

Description
The length of the shell attains 35.8 mm.

Distribution
This marine species occurs in the Gulf of Mexico

References

 Bouchet P. & Warén A. (1988). Transfer of Exilioidea Grant & Gale, 1931 to Turbinellidae, with descriptions of three new species (Neogastropoda). Venus. 47(3): 172-184.

External links
 Rosenberg, G.; Moretzsohn, F.; García, E. F. (2009). Gastropoda (Mollusca) of the Gulf of Mexico, Pp. 579–699 in: Felder, D.L. and D.K. Camp (eds.), Gulf of Mexico–Origins, Waters, and Biota. Texas A&M Press, College Station, Texas.

Ptychatractidae
Gastropods described in 1988